Senator Dennison may refer to:

William Dennison Jr. (1815–1882), Ohio State Senate
Robert Denniston (1800–1867), New York State Senate